The 82nd United States Congress was a meeting of the legislative branch of the United States federal government, composed of the United States Senate and the United States House of Representatives. It met in Washington, D.C., from January 3, 1951, to January 3, 1953, during the last two years of President Harry S. Truman's second term in office.

The apportionment of seats in this House of Representatives was based on the 1940 United States census.

Both chambers had a Democratic majority (albeit reduced from the 81st Congress), and with President Truman, maintained an overall federal government trifecta.

Major events

 March 29, 1951:  Ethel and Julius Rosenberg were convicted of conspiracy to commit espionage. On April 5 they were sentenced to receive the death penalty.
 April 11, 1951: President Truman relieved General Douglas MacArthur of his Far Eastern commands.
 April 13, 1951: Congress passed a large defense budget 372 votes for the budget and 44 votes against the budget. The budget was intended to help the United States combat communism.
 August 31, 1951: The United States Senate passes the Mutual Security Act by a vote of 61 votes in favor and 5 votes against. The act provided $7.5 billion for foreign military assistance and food aid to America's allies, primarily the United Kingdom. The vote was condemned by the government of the Soviet Union and praised by the government of the United Kingdom. 
 September 5, 1951: Treaty of San Francisco: In San Francisco, California, 48 nations signed a peace treaty with Japan to formally end the Pacific War.
 October 24, 1951:  President Truman declared an official end to war with Germany.
 November 10, 1951: Direct dial coast-to-coast telephone service began in the United States.
 December 31, 1951: The Marshall Plan expired after distributing more than $13.3 billion USD in foreign aid to rebuild Europe.
 March 29, 1952: President Truman announced that he will not seek reelection.
 June 19, 1952: The Special Forces created.
 July 25, 1952: Puerto Rico became a Commonwealth of the United States, an unincorporated organized territory, with the ratification of its constitution.
 November 4, 1952: 1952 United States presidential election: Republican Dwight D. Eisenhower defeated Democrat Adlai Stevenson
 November 4, 1952: National Security Agency founded.

Major legislation

 October 10, 1951: Mutual Security Act, ch. 479, 
 June 27, 1952: Immigration and Nationality Act (McCarran-Walter Act), 
 July 14, 1952: McGuire Act, 
 July 16, 1952: Veterans' Readjustment Assistance Act, 
 July 16, 1952: Federal Coal Mine Safety Act of 1952, 
 July 16, 1952: Wire Fraud Act of 1952,

Constitutional amendments
 February 27, 1951: Twenty-second Amendment to the United States Constitution, setting a term limit for election and overall time of service to the office of President of the United States, was ratified by the requisite number of states (then 36) to become part of the Constitution

Treaties 

 March 20, 1952: Treaty of San Francisco ratified

Party summary

Senate

House of Representatives

Leadership

Senate

 President: Alben W. Barkley (D)
 President pro tempore: Kenneth McKellar (D)

Majority (Democratic) party 
 Majority leader: Ernest McFarland
 Majority whip: Lyndon B. Johnson
 Democratic Caucus Secretary: Brien McMahon
 Policy Committee Chairman: Ernest McFarland

Minority (Republican) party 
 Minority leader: Kenneth S. Wherry, until November 29, 1951
 Styles Bridges, from January 8, 1952
 Minority whip: Leverett Saltonstall
 Republican Conference Chairman: Eugene Millikin
 Republican Conference Secretary: Milton Young
 National Senatorial Committee Chair: Owen Brewster
 Policy Committee Chairman: Robert A. Taft

House of Representatives

 Speaker: Sam Rayburn (D)

Majority (Democratic) party 
 Majority leader: John W. McCormack
 Majority whip: J. Percy Priest
 Democratic Caucus Chairman: Jere Cooper
 Democratic Campaign Committee Chairman: Michael J. Kirwan

Minority (Republican) party 
 Minority leader: Joseph W. Martin Jr.
 Minority whip: Leslie C. Arends
 Republican Conference Chairman: Clifford R. Hope
 Policy Committee Chairman: Joseph W. Martin Jr.
 Republican Campaign Committee Chairman: Leonard W. Hall

Caucuses
 House Democratic Caucus
 Senate Democratic Caucus

Members

Senate
Senators are popularly elected statewide every two years, with one-third beginning new six-year terms with each Congress. Preceding the names in the list below are Senate class numbers, which indicate the cycle of their election, In this Congress, Class 1 meant their term ended with this Congress, facing re-election in 1952; Class 2 meant their term began in the last Congress, facing re-election in 1954; and Class 3 meant their term began in this Congress, facing re-election in 1956.

Alabama 
 2. John Sparkman (D)
 3. J. Lister Hill (D)

Arizona 
 1. Ernest McFarland (D)
 3. Carl Hayden (D)

Arkansas 
 2. John L. McClellan (D)
 3. J. William Fulbright (D)

California 
 1. William Knowland (R)
 3. Richard Nixon (R), until January 1, 1953
 Thomas Kuchel (R), from January 2, 1953

Colorado 
 2. Edwin C. Johnson (D)
 3. Eugene Millikin (R)

Connecticut 
 1. William Benton (D)
 3. Brien McMahon (D), until July 28, 1952
 William A. Purtell (R), August 29, 1952 – November 4, 1952
 Prescott Bush (R), from November 5, 1952

Delaware 
 1. John J. Williams (R)
 2. J. Allen Frear Jr. (D)

Florida 
 1. Spessard Holland (D)
 3. George Smathers (D)

Georgia 
 3. Walter F. George (D)
 2. Richard Russell Jr. (D)

Idaho 
 2. Henry Dworshak (R)
 3. Herman Welker (R)

Illinois 
 2. Paul Douglas (D)
 3. Everett Dirksen (R)

Indiana 
 1. William E. Jenner (R)
 3. Homer E. Capehart (R)

Iowa 
 2. Guy Gillette (D)
 3. Bourke B. Hickenlooper (R)

Kansas 
 2. Andrew Frank Schoeppel (R)
 3. Frank Carlson (R)

Kentucky 
 2. Virgil Chapman (D), until March 8, 1951
 Thomas R. Underwood (D), March 19, 1951 – November 4, 1952
 John Sherman Cooper (R), from November 5, 1952
 3. Earle Clements (D)

Louisiana 
 2. Allen J. Ellender (D)
 3. Russell B. Long (D)

Maine 
 1. Owen Brewster (R), until December 31, 1952
 2. Margaret Chase Smith (R)

Maryland 
 1. Herbert O'Conor (D)
 3. John Marshall Butler (R)

Massachusetts 
 1. Henry Cabot Lodge Jr. (R)
 2. Leverett Saltonstall (R)

Michigan 
 1. Arthur Vandenberg (R), until April 18, 1951
 Blair Moody (D), April 23, 1951 – November 4, 1952
 Charles E. Potter (R), from November 5, 1952
 2. Homer S. Ferguson (R)

Minnesota 
 1. Edward John Thye (R)
 2. Hubert Humphrey (DFL)

Mississippi 
 1. John C. Stennis (D)
 2. James Eastland (D)

Missouri 
 1. James P. Kem (R)
 3. Thomas C. Hennings Jr. (D)

Montana 
 1. Zales Ecton (R)
 2. James E. Murray (D)

Nebraska 
 1. Hugh A. Butler (R)
 2. Kenneth S. Wherry (R), until November 29, 1951
 Fred A. Seaton (R), December 10, 1951 – November 4, 1952
 Dwight Griswold (R), from November 5, 1952

Nevada 
 1. George W. Malone (R)
 3. Pat McCarran (D)

New Hampshire 
 2. Styles Bridges (R)
 3. Charles W. Tobey (R)

New Jersey 
 1. Howard Alexander Smith (R)
 2. Robert C. Hendrickson (R)

New Mexico 
 1. Dennis Chávez (D)
 2. Clinton Anderson (D)

New York 
 1. Irving Ives (R)
 3. Herbert H. Lehman (D)

North Carolina 
 2. Willis Smith (D)
 3. Clyde R. Hoey (D)

North Dakota 
 1. William Langer (R-NPL)
 3. Milton Young (R)

Ohio 
 1. John W. Bricker (R)
 3. Robert A. Taft (R)

Oklahoma 
 2. Robert S. Kerr (D)
 3. Mike Monroney (D)

Oregon 
 2. Guy Cordon (R)
 3. Wayne Morse (R)

Pennsylvania 
 1. Edward Martin (R)
 3. James H. Duff (R)

Rhode Island 
 1. John Pastore (D)
 2. Theodore F. Green (D)

South Carolina 
 2. Burnet R. Maybank (D)
 3. Olin D. Johnston (D)

South Dakota 
 2. Karl E. Mundt (R)
 3. Francis H. Case (R)

Tennessee 
 1. Kenneth McKellar (D)
 2. Estes Kefauver (D)

Texas 
 1. Tom Connally (D)
 2. Lyndon B. Johnson (D)

Utah 
 1. Arthur Vivian Watkins (R)
 3. Wallace F. Bennett (R)

Vermont 
 1. Ralph Flanders (R)
 3. George Aiken (R)

Virginia 
 1. Harry F. Byrd (D)
 2. Absalom Willis Robertson (D)

Washington 
 1. Harry P. Cain (R)
 3. Warren Magnuson (D)

West Virginia 
 1. Harley M. Kilgore (D)
 2. Matthew M. Neely (D)

Wisconsin 
 1. Joseph McCarthy (R)
 3. Alexander Wiley (R)

Wyoming 
 1. Joseph C. O'Mahoney (D)
 2. Lester C. Hunt (D)

House of Representatives
The names of members of the House of Representatives are preceded by their district numbers.

Alabama 
 . Frank W. Boykin (D)
 . George M. Grant (D)
 . George W. Andrews (D)
 . Kenneth A. Roberts (D)
 . Albert Rains (D)
 . Edward deGraffenried (D)
 . Carl Elliott (D)
 . Robert E. Jones Jr. (D)
 . Laurie C. Battle (D)

Arizona 
 . John R. Murdock (D)
 . Harold A. Patten (D)

Arkansas 
 . Ezekiel C. Gathings (D)
 . Wilbur Mills (D)
 . James William Trimble (D)
 . Boyd Tackett (D)
 . Brooks Hays (D)
 . William F. Norrell (D)
 . Oren Harris (D)

California 
 . Hubert B. Scudder (R)
 . Clair Engle (D)
 . J. Leroy Johnson (R)
 . Franck R. Havenner (D)
 . John F. Shelley (D)
 . George P. Miller (D)
 . John J. Allen Jr. (R)
 . Jack Z. Anderson (R)
 . Allan O. Hunter (R)
 . Thomas H. Werdel (R)
 . Ernest K. Bramblett (R)
 . Patrick J. Hillings (R)
 . Norris Poulson (R)
 . Sam Yorty (D)
 . Gordon L. McDonough (R)
 . Donald L. Jackson (R)
 . Cecil R. King (D)
 . Clyde Doyle (D)
 . Chester E. Holifield (D)
 . John Carl Hinshaw (R)
 . Harry R. Sheppard (D)
 . John R. Phillips (R)
 . Clinton D. McKinnon (D)

Colorado 
 . Byron G. Rogers (D)
 . William S. Hill (R)
 . John Chenoweth (R)
 . Wayne N. Aspinall (D)

Connecticut 
 . Antoni Sadlak (R)
 . Abraham Ribicoff (D)
 . Horace Seely-Brown Jr. (R)
 . John A. McGuire (D)
 . Albert P. Morano (R)
 . James T. Patterson (R)

Delaware 
 . J. Caleb Boggs (R)

Florida 
 . Chester B. McMullen (D)
 . Charles E. Bennett (D)
 . Bob Sikes (D)
 . Bill Lantaff (D)
 . Syd Herlong (D)
 . Dwight L. Rogers (D)

Georgia 
 . Prince Hulon Preston Jr. (D)
 . Edward E. Cox (D), until December 24, 1952
 . Tic Forrester (D)
 . Albert Sidney Camp (D)
 . James C. Davis (D)
 . Carl Vinson (D)
 . Henderson Lovelace Lanham (D)
 . William McDonald Wheeler (D)
 . John Stephens Wood (D)
 . Paul Brown (D)

Idaho 
 . John Travers Wood (R)
 . Hamer H. Budge (R)

Illinois 
 . William L. Dawson (D)
 . Richard B. Vail (R)
 . Fred E. Busbey (R)
 . William E. McVey (R)
 . John C. Kluczynski (D)
 . Thomas J. O'Brien (D)
 . Adolph J. Sabath (D), until November 6, 1952
 . Thomas S. Gordon (D)
 . Sidney R. Yates (D)
 . Richard W. Hoffman (R)
 . Timothy P. Sheehan (R)
 . Edgar A. Jonas (R)
 . Marguerite S. Church (R)
 . Chauncey W. Reed (R)
 . Noah M. Mason (R)
 . Leo E. Allen (R)
 . Leslie C. Arends (R)
 . Harold H. Velde (R)
 . Robert B. Chiperfield (R)
 . Sid Simpson (R)
 . Peter F. Mack Jr. (D)
 . William L. Springer (R)
 . Edward H. Jenison (R)
 . Charles W. Vursell (R)
 . Melvin Price (D)
 . C. W. Bishop (R)

Indiana 
 . Ray Madden (D)
 . Charles A. Halleck (R)
 . Shepard J. Crumpacker Jr. (R)
 . E. Ross Adair (R)
 . John V. Beamer (R)
 . Cecil M. Harden (R)
 . William G. Bray (R)
 . Winfield K. Denton (D)
 . Earl Wilson (R)
 . Ralph Harvey (R)
 . Charles B. Brownson (R)

Iowa 
 . Thomas E. Martin (R)
 . Henry O. Talle (R)
 . H. R. Gross (R)
 . Karl M. LeCompte (R)
 . Paul Cunningham (R)
 . James I. Dolliver (R)
 . Ben F. Jensen (R)
 . Charles B. Hoeven (R)

Kansas 
 . Albert M. Cole (R)
 . Errett P. Scrivner (R)
 . Myron V. George (R)
 . Edward Herbert Rees (R)
 . Clifford R. Hope (R)
 . Wint Smith (R)

Kentucky 
 . Noble J. Gregory (D)
 . John A. Whitaker (D), until December 15, 1951
 Garrett Withers (D), from August 2, 1952
 . Thruston Ballard Morton (R)
 . Frank Chelf (D)
 . Brent Spence (D)
 . Thomas R. Underwood (D), until March 17, 1951
 John C. Watts (D), from April 14, 1951
 . Carl D. Perkins (D)
 . Joe B. Bates (D)
 . James S. Golden (R)

Louisiana 
 . F. Edward Hébert (D)
 . Hale Boggs (D)
 . Edwin E. Willis (D)
 . Overton Brooks (D)
 . Otto Passman (D)
 . James H. Morrison (D)
 . Henry D. Larcade Jr. (D)
 . A. Leonard Allen (D)

Maine 
 . Robert Hale (R)
 . Charles P. Nelson (R)
 . Frank Fellows (R), until August 27, 1951
 Clifford McIntire (R), from October 22, 1951

Maryland 
 . Edward Tylor Miller (R)
 . James Devereux (R)
 . Edward Garmatz (D)
 . George Hyde Fallon (D)
 . Lansdale G. Sasscer (D)
 . James Glenn Beall (R)

Massachusetts 
 . John W. Heselton (R)
 . Foster Furcolo (D), until September 30, 1952
 . Philip J. Philbin (D)
 . Harold Donohue (D)
 . Edith Nourse Rogers (R)
 . William H. Bates (R)
 . Thomas J. Lane (D)
 . Angier Goodwin (R)
 . Donald W. Nicholson (R)
 . Christian Herter (R)
 . John F. Kennedy (D)
 . John W. McCormack (D)
 . Richard B. Wigglesworth (R)
 . Joseph W. Martin Jr. (R)

Michigan 
 . Thaddeus M. Machrowicz (D)
 . George Meader (R)
 . Paul W. Shafer (R)
 . Clare Hoffman (R)
 . Gerald Ford (R)
 . William W. Blackney (R)
 . Jesse P. Wolcott (R)
 . Fred L. Crawford (R)
 . Ruth Thompson (R)
 . Roy O. Woodruff (R)
 . Charles E. Potter (R), until November 4, 1952
 . John B. Bennett (R)
 . George D. O'Brien (D)
 . Louis C. Rabaut (D)
 . John Dingell Sr. (D)
 . John Lesinski Jr. (D)
 . George Anthony Dondero (R)

Minnesota 
 . August H. Andresen (R)
 . Joseph P. O'Hara (R)
 . Roy Wier (DFL)
 . Eugene McCarthy (DFL)
 . Walter Judd (R)
 . Fred Marshall (DFL)
 .Herman Carl Andersen (R)
 . John Blatnik (DFL)
 . Harold Hagen (R)

Mississippi 
 . John E. Rankin (D)
 . Jamie Whitten (D)
 . Frank Ellis Smith (D)
 . Thomas Abernethy (D)
 . W. Arthur Winstead (D)
 . William M. Colmer (D)
 . John Bell Williams (D)

Missouri 
 . Clare Magee (D)
 . Morgan M. Moulder (D)
 . Phil J. Welch (D)
 . Leonard Irving (D)
 . Richard Walker Bolling (D)
 . Orland K. Armstrong (R)
 . Dewey Jackson Short (R)
 . A. S. J. Carnahan (D)
 . Clarence Cannon (D)
 . Paul C. Jones (D)
 . John B. Sullivan (D), until January 29, 1951
 Claude I. Bakewell (R), from March 9, 1951
 . Thomas B. Curtis (R)
 . Frank M. Karsten (D)

Montana 
 . Mike Mansfield (D)
 . Wesley A. D'Ewart (R)

Nebraska 
 . Carl Curtis (R)
 . Howard H. Buffett (R)
 . Karl Stefan (R), until October 2, 1951
 Robert Dinsmore Harrison (R), from December 4, 1951
 . Arthur L. Miller (R)

Nevada 
 . Walter S. Baring Jr. (D)

New Hampshire 
 . Chester Earl Merrow (R)
 . Norris Cotton (R)

New Jersey 
 . Charles A. Wolverton (R)
 . T. Millet Hand (R)
 . James C. Auchincloss (R)
 . Charles R. Howell (D)
 . Charles A. Eaton (R)
 . Clifford P. Case (R)
 . William B. Widnall (R)
 . Gordon Canfield (R)
 . Harry L. Towe (R), until September 7, 1951
 Frank C. Osmers Jr. (R), from November 6, 1951
 . Peter W. Rodino (D)
 . Hugh Joseph Addonizio (D)
 . Robert Kean (R)
 . Alfred Dennis Sieminski (D)
 . Edward J. Hart (D)

New Mexico 
 . John J. Dempsey (D)
 . Antonio M. Fernández (D)

New York 
 . Ernest Greenwood (D)
 . Leonard W. Hall (R), until December 31, 1952
 . Henry J. Latham (R)
 . L. Gary Clemente (D)
 . T. Vincent Quinn (D), until December 30, 1951
 Robert Tripp Ross (R), from February 19, 1952
 . James J. Delaney (D)
 . Louis B. Heller (D)
 . Victor Anfuso (D)
 . Eugene J. Keogh (D)
 . Edna F. Kelly (D)
 . James J. Heffernan (D)
 . John J. Rooney (D)
 . Donald Lawrence O'Toole (D)
 . Abraham J. Multer (D)
 . Emanuel Celler (D)
 . James J. Murphy (D)
 . Frederic René Coudert Jr. (R)
 . James G. Donovan (D)
 . Arthur George Klein (D)
 . Franklin Delano Roosevelt Jr. (D)
 . Jacob Javits (R)
 . Adam Clayton Powell Jr. (D)
 . Sidney A. Fine (D)
 . Isidore Dollinger (D)
 . Charles A. Buckley (D)
 . Christopher C. McGrath (D)
 . Ralph W. Gwinn (R)
 . Ralph A. Gamble (R)
 . Katharine St. George (R)
 . J. Ernest Wharton (R)
 . Bernard W. Kearney (R)
 . William T. Byrne (D), until January 27, 1952
 Leo W. O'Brien (D), from April 1, 1952
 . Dean P. Taylor (R)
 . Clarence E. Kilburn (R)
 . William R. Williams (R)
 . R. Walter Riehlman (R)
 . Edwin Arthur Hall (R)
 . John Taber (R)
 . W. Sterling Cole (R)
 . Kenneth Keating (R)
 . Harold C. Ostertag (R)
 . William E. Miller (R)
 . Edmund P. Radwan (R)
 . John Cornelius Butler (R)
 . Daniel A. Reed (R)

North Carolina 
 . Herbert Covington Bonner (D)
 . John H. Kerr (D)
 . Graham A. Barden (D)
 . Harold D. Cooley (D)
 . Richard Thurmond Chatham (D)
 . Carl T. Durham (D)
 . Frank Ertel Carlyle (D)
 . Charles B. Deane (D)
 . Robert L. Doughton (D)
 . Hamilton C. Jones (D)
 . Woodrow W. Jones (D)
 . Monroe M. Redden (D)

North Dakota 
 . Fred G. Aandahl (R)
 . Usher L. Burdick (R-NPL)

Ohio 
 . George H. Bender (R)
 . Charles H. Elston (R)
 . William E. Hess (R)
 . Edward G. Breen (D), until October 1, 1951
 Paul F. Schenck (R), from November 6, 1951
 . William Moore McCulloch (R)
 . Cliff Clevenger (R)
 . James G. Polk (D)
 . Clarence J. Brown (R)
 . Jackson Edward Betts (R)
 . Frazier Reams (I)
 . Thomas A. Jenkins (R)
 . Walter E. Brehm (R)
 . John Martin Vorys (R)
 . Alvin F. Weichel (R)
 . William Hanes Ayres (R)
 . Robert T. Secrest (D)
 . Frank T. Bow (R)
 . J. Harry McGregor (R)
 . Wayne Hays (D)
 . Michael J. Kirwan (D)
 . Michael A. Feighan (D)
 . Robert Crosser (D)
 . Frances P. Bolton (R)

Oklahoma 
 . George B. Schwabe (R), until April 2, 1952
 . William G. Stigler (D), until August 21, 1952
 . Carl Albert (D)
 . Tom Steed (D)
 . John Jarman (D)
 . Toby Morris (D)
 . Victor Wickersham (D)
 . Page Belcher (R)

Oregon 
 . A. Walter Norblad (R)
 . Lowell Stockman (R)
 . Homer D. Angell (R)
 . Harris Ellsworth (R)

Pennsylvania 
 . William A. Barrett (D)
 . William T. Granahan (D)
 . Hardie Scott (R)
 . Earl Chudoff (D)
 . William J. Green Jr. (D)
 . Hugh Scott (R)
 . Benjamin F. James (R)
 . Albert C. Vaughn (R), until September 1, 1951
 Karl C. King (R), from November 6, 1951
 . Paul B. Dague (R)
 . Harry P. O'Neill (D)
 . Dan Flood (D)
 . Ivor D. Fenton (R)
 . George M. Rhodes (D)
 . Wilson D. Gillette (R), until August 7, 1951
 Joseph L. Carrigg (R), from November 6, 1951
 . Alvin Bush (R)
 . Samuel K. McConnell Jr. (R)
 . Richard M. Simpson (R)
 . Walter M. Mumma (R)
 . Leon H. Gavin (R)
 . Francis E. Walter (D)
 . James F. Lind (D)
 . James E. Van Zandt (R)
 . Edward L. Sittler Jr. (R)
 . Thomas E. Morgan (D)
 . Louis E. Graham (R)
 . John P. Saylor (R)
 . Augustine B. Kelley (D)
 . Carroll D. Kearns (R)
 . Harmar D. Denny Jr. (R)
 . Robert J. Corbett (R)
 . James G. Fulton (R)
 . Herman P. Eberharter (D)
 . Frank Buchanan (D), until April 27, 1951
 Vera Buchanan (D), from July 24, 1951

Rhode Island 
 . Aime Forand (D)
 . John E. Fogarty (D)

South Carolina 
 . L. Mendel Rivers (D)
 . John J. Riley (D)
 . William Jennings Bryan Dorn (D)
 . Joseph R. Bryson (D)
 . James P. Richards (D)
 . John L. McMillan (D)

South Dakota 
 . Harold Lovre (R)
 . Ellis Yarnal Berry (R)

Tennessee 
 . B. Carroll Reece (R)
 . Howard Baker Sr. (R)
 . James B. Frazier Jr. (D)
 . Albert Gore Sr. (D)
 . Joe L. Evins (D)
 . Percy Priest (D)
 . James P. Sutton (D)
 . Tom J. Murray (D)
 . Jere Cooper (D)
 . Clifford Davis (D)

Texas 
 . Wright Patman (D)
 . Jesse M. Combs (D)
 . Lindley Beckworth (D)
 . Sam Rayburn (D)
 . Joseph Franklin Wilson (D)
 . Olin E. Teague (D)
 . Tom Pickett (D), until June 30, 1952
 John Dowdy (D), from September 23, 1952
 . Albert Thomas (D)
 . Clark W. Thompson (D)
 . Homer Thornberry (D)
 . William R. Poage (D)
 . Wingate H. Lucas (D)
 . Ed Gossett (D), until July 31, 1951
 Frank N. Ikard (D), from September 8, 1951
 . John E. Lyle Jr. (D)
 . Lloyd Bentsen (D)
 . Kenneth M. Regan (D)
 . Omar Burleson (D)
 . Walter E. Rogers (D)
 . George H. Mahon (D)
 . Paul J. Kilday (D)
 . O. C. Fisher (D)

Utah 
 . Walter K. Granger (D)
 . Reva Beck Bosone (D)

Vermont 
 . Winston L. Prouty (R)

Virginia 
 . Edward J. Robeson Jr. (D)
 . Porter Hardy Jr. (D)
 . J. Vaughan Gary (D)
 . Watkins Moorman Abbitt (D)
 . Thomas B. Stanley (D)
 . Clarence G. Burton (D)
 . Burr Harrison (D)
 . Howard W. Smith (D)
 . Thomas B. Fugate (D)

Washington 
 . Hugh Mitchell (D)
 . Henry M. Jackson (D)
 . Russell V. Mack (R)
 . Hal Holmes (R)
 . Walt Horan (R)
 . Thor C. Tollefson (R)

West Virginia 
 . Robert L. Ramsay (D)
 . Harley Orrin Staggers (D)
 . Cleveland M. Bailey (D)
 . Maurice G. Burnside (D)
 . John Kee (D), until May 8, 1951
 Elizabeth Kee (D), from July 17, 1951
 . E. H. Hedrick (D)

Wisconsin 
 . Lawrence H. Smith (R)
 . Glenn Robert Davis (R)
 . Gardner R. Withrow (R)
 . Clement J. Zablocki (D)
 . Charles J. Kersten (R)
 . William Van Pelt (R)
 . Reid F. Murray (R), until April 29, 1952
 . John W. Byrnes (R)
 . Merlin Hull (R)
 . Alvin O'Konski (R)

Wyoming 
 . William Henry Harrison III (R)

Non-voting members
 . Bob Bartlett (D)
 . Joseph Rider Farrington (R)
 . Antonio Fernós-Isern (PPD)

Changes in membership
The count below reflects changes from the beginning of this Congress.

Senate

|-
| Kentucky(2)
| nowrap  | Virgil Chapman (D)
| Died March 8, 1951.Successor appointed March 19, 1951, to continue the term.
| nowrap  | Thomas R. Underwood (D)
| March 19, 1951

|-
| Michigan(1)
| nowrap  | Arthur Vandenberg (R)
| Died April 18, 1951.Successor appointed April 23, 1951, to continue the term.
| nowrap  | Blair Moody (D)
| April 23, 1951

|-
| Nebraska(2)
| nowrap  | Kenneth S. Wherry (R)
| Died November 29, 1951.Successor appointed December 10, 1951, to continue the term.
| nowrap  | Fred A. Seaton (R)
| December 10, 1951

|-
| Connecticut(3)
| nowrap  | Brien McMahon (D)
| Died July 28, 1952.Successor appointed August 29, 1952, to continue the term.
| nowrap  | William A. Purtell (R)
| August 29, 1952

|-
| Connecticut(3)
| nowrap  | William A. Purtell (R)
| Retired upon special election.Successor elected November 4, 1952.
| nowrap  | Prescott Bush (R)
| November 5, 1952

|-
| Kentucky(2)
| nowrap  | Thomas R. Underwood (D)
| Lost election to finish the term.Successor elected November 4, 1952.
| nowrap  | John Sherman Cooper (R)
| November 5, 1952

|-
| Michigan(1)
| nowrap  | Blair Moody (D)
| Lost election to finish the term.Successor elected November 4, 1952.
| nowrap  | Charles E. Potter (R)
| November 5, 1952

|-
| Nebraska(2)
| nowrap  | Fred A. Seaton (R)
| Lost election to finish the term.Successor elected November 4, 1952.
| nowrap  | Dwight Griswold (R)
| November 5, 1952

|-
| Maine(1)
| nowrap  | Owen Brewster (R)
| Resigned December 31, 1952.Seat was not filled during this Congress.
| colspan=2 | Vacant

|-
| California(3)
| nowrap  | Richard Nixon (R)
| Resigned January 1, 1953, after being elected U.S. Vice President.Successor appointed to continue the term.
| nowrap  | Thomas Kuchel (R)
| January 2, 1953

|}

House of Representatives

|-
| 
|  nowrap| John B. Sullivan (D)
| Died January 29, 1951. Successor elected March 9, 1951.
|  nowrap | Claude I. Bakewell (R)
| March 9, 1951

|-
| 
|  nowrap| Thomas R. Underwood (D)
| Resigned March 17, 1951, after being appointed U.S. Senator.Successor elected April 4, 1951.
|  nowrap | John C. Watts (D)
| April 4, 1951

|-
| 
|  nowrap| Frank Buchanan (D)
| Died April 27, 1951. Successor elected July 24, 1951.
|  nowrap | Vera Buchanan (D)
| July 24, 1951

|-
| 
|  nowrap| John Kee (D)
| Died May 8, 1951. Successor elected July 17, 1951.
|  nowrap | Elizabeth Kee (D)
| July 17, 1951

|-
| 
|  nowrap| Ed Gossett (D)
| Resigned July 31, 1951. Successor elected September 8, 1951.
|  nowrap | Frank N. Ikard (D)
| September 8, 1951

|-
| 
|  nowrap| Wilson D. Gillette (R)
| Died August 7, 1951. Successor elected November 6, 1951.
|  nowrap | Joseph L. Carrigg (R)
| November 6, 1951

|-
| 
|  nowrap| Frank Fellows (R)
| Died August 27, 1951. Successor elected October 22, 1951.
|  nowrap | Clifford McIntire (R)
| October 22, 1951

|-
| 
|  nowrap| Albert C. Vaughn (R)
| Died September 1, 1951. Successor elected November 6, 1951.
|  nowrap | Karl C. King (R)
| November 6, 1951

|-
| 
|  nowrap| Harry L. Towe (R)
| Resigned September 7, 1951, to become Assistant Attorney General of New Jersey.Successor elected November 6, 1951.
|  nowrap | Frank C. Osmers Jr. (R)
| November 6, 1951

|-
| 
|  nowrap| Edward G. Breen (D)
| Resigned October 1, 1951, due to ill health.Successor elected November 6, 1951.
|  nowrap | Paul F. Schenck (R)
| November 6, 1951

|-
| 
|  nowrap| Karl Stefan (R)
| Died October 2, 1951. Successor elected December 4, 1951.
|  nowrap | Robert D. Harrison (R)
| December 4, 1951

|-
| 
|  nowrap| John A. Whitaker (D)
| Died December 15, 1951. Successor elected August 2, 1952.
|  nowrap | Garrett Withers (D)
| August 2, 1952

|-
| 
|  nowrap| T. Vincent Quinn (D)
| Resigned December 30, 1951, to become District Attorney of Queens County, New York.Successor elected February 19, 1952.
|  nowrap | Robert T. Ross (R)
| February 19, 1952

|-
| 
|  nowrap| William T. Byrne (D)
| Died January 27, 1952. Successor elected April 1, 1952.
|  nowrap | Leo W. O'Brien (D)
| April 1, 1952

|-
| 
|  nowrap| George B. Schwabe (R)
| Died April 2, 1952. Seat not filled during this Congress.
| colspan=2 rowspan=2| Vacant

|-
| 
|  nowrap| Reid F. Murray (R)
| Died April 29, 1952. Seat not filled during this Congress.

|-
| 
|  nowrap| Tom Pickett (D)
| Resigned June 30, 1952, to become Vice-President of the National Coal Association.Successor elected September 23, 1952.
|  nowrap | John Dowdy (D)
| September 23, 1952

|-
| 
|  nowrap| William G. Stigler (D)
| Died August 21, 1952. Seat not filled during this Congress.
| colspan=2 rowspan=6| Vacant

|-
| 
|  nowrap| Foster Furcolo (D)
| Resigned September 30, 1952, to become Treasurer and Receiver-General of Massachusetts.Seat not filled during this Congress.

|-
| 
|  nowrap| Charles E. Potter (R)
| Resigned November 4, 1952, after being elected U.S. Senator.Seat not filled during this Congress.

|-
| 
|  nowrap| Adolph J. Sabath (D)
| Died November 6, 1952. Seat not filled during this Congress.

|-
| 
|  nowrap| Edward E. Cox (D)
| Died December 24, 1952. Seat not filled during this Congress.

|-
| 
|  nowrap| Leonard W. Hall (R)
| Resigned December 31, 1952. Seat not filled during this Congress.
|}

Committees

Senate

 Agriculture and Forestry (Chairman: Allen J. Ellender; Ranking Member: George D. Aiken)
 Appropriations (Chairman: Kenneth McKellar; Ranking Member: Styles Bridges)
 Armed Services (Chairman: Richard B. Russell; Ranking Member: Styles Bridges)
 Banking and Currency (Chairman: Burnet R. Maybank; Ranking Member: Homer Capehart)
 District of Columbia (Chairman: Matthew M. Neely; Ranking Member: Francis Case)
 Expenditures in Executive Departments (Chairman: John L. McClellan; Ranking Member: Joseph McCarthy)
 Finance (Chairman: Walter F. George; Ranking Member: Eugene D. Millikin)
 Foreign Relations (Chairman: Tom Connally; Ranking Member: Arthur H. Vandenberg)
 Interior and Insular Affairs (Chairman: Joseph C. O'Mahoney; Ranking Member: Hugh Butler)
 Interstate and Foreign Commerce (Chairman: Edwin C. Johnson; Ranking Member: Charles W. Tobey)
 Judiciary (Chairman: Pat McCarran; Ranking Member: Alexander Wiley) 
 Labor and Public Welfare (Chairman: James E. Murray; Ranking Member: Robert A. Taft)
 Organized Crime in Interstate Commerce (Select)
 Post Office and Civil Service (Chairman: Olin D. Johnston; Ranking Member: William Langer)
 Public Works (Chairman: Dennis Chavez; Ranking Member: Harry P. Cain)
 Remodeling the Senate Chamber (Special)
 Rules and Administration (Chairman: Carl Hayden; Ranking Member: Kenneth S. Wherry)
 Small Business (Select) (Chairman: John J. Sparkman)
 Subcommittee on Internal Security
 Whole

House of Representatives

 Agriculture (Chairman: Harold D. Cooley; Ranking Member: Clifford R. Hope)
 Appropriations (Chairman: Clarence Cannon; Ranking Member: John Taber)
 Armed Services (Chairman: Carl Vinson; Ranking Member: Dewey J. Short)
 Banking and Currency (Chairman: Brent Spence; Ranking Member: Jesse P. Wolcott)
 District of Columbia (Chairman: John L. McMillan; Ranking Member: Sid Simpson)
 Education and Labor (Chairman: Graham A. Barden; Ranking Member: Samuel K. McConnell Jr.)
 Expenditures in the Executive Departments (Chairman: William L. Dawson; Ranking Member: Clare E. Hoffman)
 Foreign Affairs (Chairman: John Kee; Ranking Member: Charles Aubrey Eaton)
 House Administration (Chairman: Thomas B. Stanley; Ranking Member: Karl M. LeCompte)
 Interior and Insular Affairs (Chairman: John R. Murdock; Ranking Member: Fred L. Crawford)
 Interstate and Foreign Commerce (Chairman: Robert Crosser; Ranking Member: Charles A. Wolverton)
 Investigate Campaign Expenditures (Select) (Chairman: N/A; Ranking Member: N/A)
 Investigate Foundations and Other Organizations (Select) (Chairman: N/A; Ranking Member: N/A)
 Investigate Educational, Training, and Loan Guaranty Programs under the G.I. Bill (Select) (Chairman: Olin E. Teague)
 Investigate the Use of Chemicals in Food and Cosmetics (Select) (Chairman: N/A)
 Katyn Forest Massacre Investigation (Select) (Chairman: Ray J. Madden)
 Judiciary (Chairman: Emanuel Celler; Ranking Member: Chauncey W. Reed) 
 Merchant Marine and Fisheries (Chairman: Edward J. Hart; Ranking Member: Alvin F. Weichel)
 Post Office and Civil Service (Chairman: Tom J. Murray; Ranking Member: Edward H. Rees)
 Public Works (Chairman: Charles A. Buckley; Ranking Member: George A. Dondero)
 Rules (Chairman: Adolph J. Sabath; Ranking Member: Leo E. Allen)
 Small Business (Select) (Chairman: Wright Patman)
 Standards of Official Conduct 
 Un-American Activities (Chairman: John S. Wood; Ranking Member: Harold H. Velde)
 Veterans' Affairs (Chairman: John E. Rankin; Ranking Member: Edith Nourse Rogers)
 Ways and Means (Chairman: Robert L. Doughton; Ranking Member: Daniel A. Reed)
 Whole

Joint committees

 Atomic Energy (Chairman: Sen. Brien McMahon; Vice Chairman: Rep. Carl T. Durham)
 Conditions of Indian Tribes (Special)
 Defense Production (Chairman: Sen. Burnet R. Maybank; Vice Chairman: Rep. Paul Brown)
 Disposition of Executive Papers
 Economic (Chairman: Rep. Joseph C. O'Mahoney)
 Immigration and Nationality Policy
 Legislative Budget
 The Library (Chairman: Sen. Theodore F. Green)
 Navajo-Hopi Indian Administration
 Printing (Chairman: Sen. Carl Hayden; Vice Chairman: Rep. Thomas B. Stanley)
 Railroad Retirement Legislation
 Reduction of Nonessential Federal Expenditures (Chairman: Sen. Harry F. Byrd; Vice Chairman: Rep. Robert L. Doughton)
 Taxation (Chairman: Rep. Robert L. Doughton; Vice Chairman: Sen. Walter F. George)

Employees

Legislative branch agency directors
 Architect of the Capitol: David Lynn
 Attending Physician of the United States Congress: George Calver
 Comptroller General of the United States: Lindsay C. Warren
 Librarian of Congress: Luther H. Evans 
 Public Printer of the United States: John J. Deviny

Senate
 Chaplain: Frederick Brown Harris (Methodist) 
 Parliamentarian: Charles Watkins
 Secretary: Leslie Biffle
 Librarian: Richard D. Hupman
 Secretary for the Majority: Felton McLellan Johnston
 Secretary for the Minority: J. Mark Trice
 Sergeant at Arms: Joseph C. Duke

House of Representatives
 Chaplain: Bernard Braskamp (Presbyterian)
 Clerk: Ralph R. Roberts
 Doorkeeper: William Mosley "Fishbait" Miller
 Parliamentarian: Lewis Deschler
 Postmaster: Finis E. Scott
 Reading Clerks: George J. Maurer (D) and Alney E. Chaffee (R)
 Sergeant at Arms: Joseph H. Callahan

See also 
 1950 United States elections (elections leading to this Congress)
 1950 United States Senate elections
 1950 United States House of Representatives elections
 1952 United States elections (elections during this Congress, leading to the next Congress)
 1952 United States presidential election
 1952 United States Senate elections
 1952 United States House of Representatives elections

Notes

References

External links